Andrew Abba (born 25 November 1989) is a Solomon Islands footballer who plays as a forward for Waitakere United in the ISPS Handa Premiership. He was named to the national team in 2013, and made his debut in a FIFA World Cup qualifier against Tahiti.

He moved to Nelson College at the age of 17 after receiving a scholarship, and has played his club football in the country ever since.

International career

International goals
Scores and results list the Solomon Islands' goal tally first.

References

Living people
1989 births
Association football forwards
Solomon Islands international footballers
Solomon Islands footballers
Waitakere United players
New Zealand Football Championship players